More than 1000 festivals are held in Turkey every year. Along with festivals of local scale held in almost every city of the country, cultural events and other festivals of international reach are also organized in major metropolitan centers such as Istanbul, Ankara, İzmir and Antalya.

Istanbul is the most important center of festivals. In the summer months, a number of music festivals are held in Istanbul. Many are organized by and associated with prominent names in Turkey's private sector. The Pamukbank Dance Days brings world famous dance groups to Istanbul. The Efes Pilsen Blues Festival, which celebrated its 10th year in 2006, hosts well-known blues and jazz groups. The Akbank International Jazz Festival provides the opportunity of improvisation and jam sessions between Turkish musicians and jazz masters of the world. The Yapı Kredi Art Festival with its concerts ranging from rock and roll and pop music to classical music and jazz is actually a series of events around the year. Fuji Film World Music Days is yet another important music festival.

İzmir is notable for hosting the oldest festival activity in Turkey, within the frame of multi-theme İzmir International Fair held in the first days of September, and organized by İZFAŞ, a depending company of İzmir Metropolitan Municipality. The musical and other cultural events that take place at the same time as the commercial fair had started out as an auxiliary activity to attract popular interest for the fair, but over the years the festival became a school by itself.

 
Society of Turkey
Turkey 
 Turkey
Festivals
Turkey
Turkey
 Turkey
 Turkey
Festivals